Charalambos Makridis (born 5 July 1996) is a German professional footballer who plays as a forward for 2. Bundesliga club Jahn Regensburg. He made his professional debut in the DFB-Pokal on 30 October 2019 against Borussia Dortmund.

References

External links
 

1996 births
Living people
People from Minden
Sportspeople from Detmold (region)
German footballers
Citizens of Greece through descent
Greek footballers
Greek expatriate footballers
German people of Greek descent
Sportspeople of Greek descent
Association football forwards
SC Verl players
SSV Jahn Regensburg players
Borussia Mönchengladbach players
Borussia Mönchengladbach II players
2. Bundesliga players
Regionalliga players
Footballers from North Rhine-Westphalia